Khalda was a Hansa A Type cargo ship which was built as Tiefland in 1943 by Lübecker Flenderwerke AG, Lübeck, Germany for Hamburg Südamerikanische Dampfschifffahrts-Gesellschaft A/S & Co K, Hamburg . She was seized as a prize of war in 1945, passing to the Ministry of War Transport and renamed Empire Gatehouse. She was sold to Canada in 1947 and was renamed Gulfport. She was sold to Liberia in 1964 and was renamed Stefani, then Agia Marina in 1966. She was sold to Greece in 1967 and renamed Bright. Sold in 1969 to Panama and renamed Khalda, she was arrested in 1974. Sold to Ethiopia in 1977, she was scrapped in 1982.

Description

The engine was built by Ottensener Eisenwerke AG, Hamburg.

History
Tiefland was a Hansa A Type cargo ship built in 1943 as yard number 344 by Lübecker Flenderwerke AG, Lübeck, Germany for Hamburg Südamerikanische Dampfschifffahrts-Gesellschaft A/S & Co K, Hamburg. She was launched on 15 July and completed on 26 October. Her port of registry was Hamburg.

In May 1945, Tiefland was seized as a prize of war at Brunsbüttel. The Code Letters GSPL and United Kingdom Official Number 180737 were allocated. Her port of registry was London and she was operated under the management of Brown,  Atkinson & Co. Ltd., Hull.

In 1947, Empire Gatehouse was sold to the Gulfport Steamship Co., Montreal, Canada and was renamed Gulfport. The Code Letters VYDR were allocated. With their introduction in the 1960s, Gulfport was allocated the Lloyd's Register Number 5137846.

In 1964, Gulfport was sold to the Alma Shipping Co., Liberia and was renamed Stefani. She was sold to M N Arcadis, Liberia in 1966 and was renamed Agia Marina. In 1967, Agia Marina was sold to the Bright Shipping Co., Greece and was renamed Bright.

In 1969, Bright was sold to the Khalda Shipping Co., Panama and was renamed Khalda. She ran aground in the Gulf of Suez in December 1970 and was refloated on 1 January 1971. Arrested at Massawa, Ethiopia in 1974, she was sold by Court Order in 1977 to A W & Y F Obeid. Reported to be in a damaged condition at the time of sale, she was scrapped in 1982.

References

External links
Colour photograph of Gulfport.

1943 ships
Ships built in Germany
World War II merchant ships of Germany
Steamships of Germany
Empire ships
Ministry of War Transport ships
Merchant ships of the United Kingdom
Steamships of the United Kingdom
Merchant ships of Canada
Steamships of Canada
Merchant ships of Liberia
Steamships of Liberia
Merchant ships of Greece
Steamships of Greece
Merchant ships of Panama
Steamships of Panama
Merchant ships of Ethiopia
Steamships of Ethiopia